Chak-pur are the traditional tools used in Tibetan sandpainting to produce sand mandalas. They are conically shaped metal funnels and often have ridges down the sides. A Tibetan monk will usually tap glide a piece of wood over the ridges in order to slowly allow the sand to emerge through the hole through the vibrations created.

References

Artistic techniques
Sand paintings
Tibetan art